The Witcher: Nightmare of the Wolf is an adult animated dark fantasy film for Netflix, produced by Lauren Schmidt Hissrich, and starring Theo James, Lara Pulver, Graham McTavish, and Mary McDonnell. The film serves as a spin-off of the Netflix series The Witcher. It focuses on the origin story of Geralt's mentor and fellow witcher Vesemir. The film premiered on August 23, 2021.

Plot
In 1165, the witcher Vesemir saves a noble child from a leshen in a forest in Kaedwen. Before dying, the creature says something in an archaic elven dialect to Vesemir, leading him to think it was under someone's control. Vesemir is visited by the elf Filavandrel, who thinks the leshen was controlled by Kitsu, one of many elven girls who have gone missing. Meanwhile sorceress  Tetra Gilcrest tries to convince the Kaedwani king to wipe out the witchers, but Lady Zerbst, another courtier, is sympathetic to the witchers and speaks in their favor.

Vesemir reminisces about his youth when he, along with his best friend Illyana, were servants for a noble whose mistress was saved from a mahr by a witcher named Deglan with Vesemir's help. Enticed by promises of coin and riches, Vesemir traveled to Kaer Morhen and underwent the training and mutations to become a witcher.

In the present day, Vesemir and another fellow witcher, Luka, are arrested for killing two knights in a bar fight. Lady Zerbst persuades the king to send Vesemir along with Tetra to rid the forest of Kitsu. She personally delivers the mission order to Vesemir who recognizes her as the now 70-year old Illyana. Vesemir and Tetra set out and she tells him the story of a young sorceress wrongfully killed by a witcher as part of a con, and that she is convinced that all witchers are corrupted. They find Kitsu, mutated and now able to cast powerful illusions, and fight her basilisk. They kill the monster, but Kitsu escapes.

Following Kitsu, the pair come across an old and abandoned elven school where they find the bodies of the other missing female elves. They rescue the captured Filavandrel, who explains that Kitsu tried to replicate the experiments that were done on her, and they come to the conclusion that witchers were responsible, creating new monsters to keep them in business. Vesemir surmises that the monsters he encountered were probably created in Kaer Morhen and leaves to confront Deglan. As he departs, Tetra destroys Kitsu's den, finds Kitsu later surveying the destruction, and blames the witchers. Back at court, she likewise tells the king of the witchers' responsibility in the recent monsters attacks and is given authorization to lay siege to Kaer Morhen. The King has Luka wrongly executed despite Lady Zerbst's protests. She then escapes to warn the witchers.

Deglan admits to Vesemir to creating the monsters, including Kitsu, to protect their way of life and are alerted by Illyana of Tetra's assault. Tetra and the local townsfolk attack Kaer Morhen with Kitsu and her monsters. Illyana helps the witcher recruits flee into the mountains. Vesemir confronts Tetra, who has captured the mages and is holding them hostage in the basement. Kitsu arrives and plunges Vesemir into an illusion where he married Illyana and had a family. However, Vesemir is able to break out of the illusion and engages in a fierce battle with Tetra and her forces. He seemingly kills Tetra and Kitsu, only for it to be revealed as another illusion. He had instead mortally wounded Illyana and killed the mages, meaning that the art of creating more witchers died with them.

Tetra reveals she is the daughter of the sorceress killed by the swindling witcher from her story before being killed by a dying Deglan. He asks Vesemir to find the recruits and make them into "better men" before succumbing to his wounds. At the behest of Illyana, Vesemir allows Kitsu to flee, and he carries a dying Illyana from the burning castle. Vesemir takes Illyana to a lake, where she always dreamed of living by. The two share a brief moment before she peacefully passes away. He then sets out and catches up to the recruits, including a young Geralt, taking them under his wing as the last batch of witchers.

Voice cast

Additional voices by Sara Cravens, JP Karliak, Andrew Morgado, Fred Tatasciore, Courtenay Taylor, and Abby Trott.

Crew
 Meredith Layne - Casting and Voice Director

Production
In January 2020, Netflix announced that an animated film adaptation was in the works from Korean animation studio Studio Mir. Writer Beau DeMayo explained that the team chose to make the film animated rather than live-action because it presented them with some "exciting" storytelling possibilities. The film uses a mix of both traditional and computer-generated animation. When designing Vesemir, animation director Han Kwang Il believed he "shouldn't be too handsome, but he had to be quite good-looking and appealing because he's the main character". For a majority of the character designs, the team aimed for a "European/American style", with the exception of Tetra, whose design fell in more closely with a "Japanese style".

Release
During the virtual WitcherCon event in July 2021, a "Date Announcement" teaser was released. A teaser trailer was released on July 21, followed by the full trailer on August 9. The film was released on August 23, 2021.

Reception
 

The film was nominated for Best Animated Special Production at the 49th Annie Awards.

References

External links
 
 

2021 films
2021 animated films
2021 fantasy films
South Korean animated films
American adult animated films
The Witcher
Sword and sorcery films
Films based on multiple works of a series
Nudity in film
English-language Netflix original films
2020s English-language films
2020s American films
Studio Mir films